The Andrews A1 was a flying ½-scale replica of the un-built Andrews A2 New Zealand agricultural aircraft.

Development
The Andrews A2 was designed by C.G. Andrews in Wellington, New Zealand, intended to compete in the market for a de Havilland Tiger Moth replacement in New Zealand's Aerial Topdressing industry.  From the outset it was intended that a ½-scale model of the type be built and flown to prove the design, and this became the Andrews A1.

The Andrews A1 is a conventional low-wing thick-section monoplane of plywood-covered spruce and steel construction with a bubble-type canopy, powered by a 65 hp Continental flat 4 air-cooled engine, and with spatted tailwheel undercarriage.

Operational history
First flown in 1957, the A1 successfully completed flight testing, but by that time the market for the larger Andrews A2 was clearly dominated by the more modern Fletcher Fu24.

The sole Andrews A1, ZK-BLU, was sold to a private owner.  It was owned for many years by Alan Rowe, best known as the designer of the Rowe R6b model aircraft, and is now owned by P.G. Alexander of Blenheim, continuing to fly regularly.

Variants
Andrews A2A proposed agricultural aircraft to be optimised for Aerial topdressing.
Andrews A1A flying scale replica of the A2 built to verify aerodynamic qualities and flying characteristics.

Specifications (A1)

Notes

References

1960s New Zealand agricultural aircraft
Aircraft manufactured in New Zealand
Low-wing aircraft
Single-engined tractor aircraft
Aircraft first flown in 1957